Low-impact development (LID) has been defined as "development which through its low negative environmental impact either enhances or does not significantly diminish environmental quality".

The interplay between would-be developers and the UK planning authorities since the 1980s has led to a diversity of unique, locally adapted developments, often making use of natural, local and reclaimed materials in delivering highly affordable, low or zero carbon housing. These LIDs often strive to be self-sufficient in terms of waste management, energy, water and other needs.

There are numerous examples of LIDs throughout the UK, and local and national authorities have come to recognise the need for the concept to be incorporated into planning strategies.

Definition

Low-impact development (LID), in the UK sense of the term, was described by Simon Fairlie, a former editor of The Ecologist magazine, in 1996 as: "development that through its low impact either enhances or does not significantly diminish environmental quality." Fairlie later wrote:

In 2009 Fairlie revised his definition of a LID as: "development which, by virtue of its low or benign environmental impact, may be allowed in locations where conventional development is not permitted." He explained:

Others have expanded on the definition. A study by the University of West England acknowledged that: "LID is usually integrally connected with land management and as much as describing physical development, LID also describes a form of livelihood." However, it also states that as LID is a "multi featured and intrinsically integrated form of development," a simple definition cannot capture the meaning of LID and goes on to develop "a detailed themed definition with detailed criteria."

Dr Larch Maxey in 2013 held the main features of LID to be:
 locally adapted, diverse and unique
 based on renewable resources
 of an appropriate scale
 visually unobtrusive
 enhances biodiversity
 increases public access to open space
 generates little traffic
 linked to sustainable livelihoods
 co-ordinated by a management plan

Examples

England

English LID examples include the Hockerton Housing Project (Nottinghamshire), Michael Buck's cob house in Oxfordshire, Landmatters (Devon) and Tinker's Bubble (Somerset).

Transition Homes, currently under development in Transition Town Totnes, Devon, is an attempt to scale-up and mainstream LID by providing around 25 low cost, low carbon homes designed along permaculture principles. Residents will be allocated from the local housing needs register. Similarly, LILAC built in 2013 a 'Low Impact Living Affordable Community' of 20 homes and a common house in Bramley, Leeds, which was visited by Kevin McCloud and Mark Prisk, Minister of State for Housing and Local Government.

BedZED (London) is another example of a larger scale LID, which was built in 2000–2002 and has 82 homes, however it is not as affordable as many of the above examples as it was partly designed to attract urban professionals.

Scotland
Findhorn Ecovillage has won a number of international awards. Steve James's Straw House, Dumfries was built for £4,000.

Wales
The House of the Future, Cardiff, completed in 2000, was originally a showcase of the latest green building technologies, and later transformed into an education centre. That Roundhouse (Brithdir Mawr, Newport, Pembrokeshire) was granted planning permission in 2008 with a review in 3 years. In West Wales, Lammas Ecovillage (near Crymych, Pembrokeshire) is a community of independent, off-grid households begun in 2009. Nearby Pwll Broga roundhouse is a development that was built without planning permission in 2012, refused retrospective planning permission in 2014, but granted permission in July 2015, having met the requirements of the Welsh government's One Planet Development (OPD) policy. From 2010 to 2019, 24 applications had been approved in Wales, with the majority in Pembrokeshire, but there has been criticism that the developments were not being properly monitored for compliance with OPD: in essence that "developers can show they can make a basic income off the land and provide all their own energy and water". According to the BBC, in 2019 there were 41 registered OPD dwellings in Wales, with a climate scientist claiming there was scope, in terms of available land, for up to 10,000 such developments.

In 2017, the term "eco-hamlet" was used to describe Pentre Solar, a development of six houses at Glanrhyd, near Llantood, Pembrokeshire; using locally sourced timber, solar power and shared electric transport, the project was designed for local people on the council housing waiting list, and was supported by the Welsh Government. This was the first such project in Wales, and possibly in the UK, and was created by Western Solar, the company that established the first solar park in Wales, at Rhosygilwen, Rhoshill.

Benefits

Substantial research has concluded that LID represents some of the most innovative and sustainable development in the UK.

LIDs have innovated and demonstrated sustainable solutions including low/zero carbon housing design, rainwater harvesting, renewable energy generation, waste minimisation and innovative forms of land management, including No/low-till farming, permaculture and agroforestry.

LID has also shown a capacity to enhance local biodiversity and public access to local space, and to produce traffic movements far below the national average. This has been attributed to lift-sharing, to residents' greater use of public transport, walking and cycling and to the integration of local land based employment with other household activities. As the Welsh Assembly Government has noted, such "...Development therefore is not just describing a physical development. It is describing a way of living differently where there is a symbiotic relationship between people and land, making a reduction in environmental impacts possible".

Constraints

Over the years, there have been various struggles with planning authorities over LID in the UK. Tony Wrench spent over a decade fighting the planning authorities until he was granted planning permission for That Roundhouse. As Lisa Lewinsohn points out in her MSc thesis on LID, Tony Wrench and his partner Jane Faith have been "enforced against, fined, refused planning permission several times" while Lammas has "probably spent about £50,000 on the application process." Similarly, since 1986 Tir Penrhos Isaf has tried several times to get planning permission and only succeeded in December 2006, twenty years after their first planning application was submitted.

The residents of Tir Penrhos Isaf consider:

Government policy

The extensive research interest in LID, backed up by the practical examples of the existing LIDs, has led to a growing number of planning policies in the UK designed to allow for LIDs. and the Welsh Assembly Government's One Planet Development policy (OPD) which is supported by the independent One Planet Council. The first development to receive permanent planning permission under the One Planet scheme was Nant-y-Cwm, near Caerphilly. The criteria for OPD in Wales include the requirement that 65% of all subsistence, or 30% of food and 35% of livelihood, come from the land.

See also
 Degrowth
 Diggers and Dreamers
 Ecovillage
 Radical Routes

References

Further reading
 Bird, Chris. Local Sustainable Homes – How to make them happen in your community. Green Books, 2010  
 Cotterell, Jane & Dadeby, Adam. The Passivhaus Handbook: A practical guide to constructing and retrofitting buildings for ultra-low-energy performance. Green Books, 2012.  
 Evans, Ianto; Smith, Michael; Smiley, Linda. The Hand Sculpted House: A Practical and Philosophical Guide to Building a Cob Cottage. Green Books, 2010  
 Jones, Barbara. Building with Straw Bales: A Practical Guide for the UK and Ireland. Green Books, 2009.  
 Wimbush, Paul. Experience, Implications and Potential of Low Impact Development in Wales. University of Wales, Newport 
 Wrench, Tony. Building a Low Impact Roundhouse. Permanent Publications, 2007.

External links

Low-impact developments
 The Landmatters co-operative, Devon
 LILAC – Low-Impact Living Affordable Community, Yorkshire
 Tir Penrhos Isaf, Permaculture holding, Gwyedd, Wales
 Simon Dale's houses, Wales
 Steward Community Woodland, Devon
 Cae Mabon, Eco Retreat Centre, Snowdonia
 Keveral Farm, Cornwall
 Down to Earth, Gower
 LAND Centres, Permaculture Association – a list of publicly accessible land-based Permaculture projects in the UK
 A map of LAND Centres in the UK – maintained by Permaculture Magazine

Supporting organisations and resources
 The Ecological Land Co-operative – supporting and enabling low-impact development in the UK
 LILI – The Low Impact Living Initiative – a non-profit network of those involved with LID
 One Wales : One Planet : The Sustainable Development Scheme of the Welsh Assembly Government
 Does Welsh National Planning Policy effectively address Low Impact Development in the open countryside? – Paper by Louise Kulbicki   
 The Role of Scientific Knowledge and Other knowledge Types in Grassroots Sustainability Initiatives: An Exploratory Case Study of a Low Impact Development Eco-village in Wales – MSc thesis by Karolina Rietzler
 The Land Magazine
 Permaculture Magazine
 Living in the Future – 50-minute documentary film telling the story of the "UK's first planned ecoVillage, Lammas."
 Living in the Future website – A video series about Ecovillages – community and low impact living

Simple living
Sustainable architecture
Low-energy building in the United Kingdom
Housing in England
Mixed-use developments in the United Kingdom
Ecovillages
Environmental impact in the United Kingdom
Environmental mitigation